The Raphaël Fishing Company Ltd is a Mauritian fishing company founded by its namesake Veuve Raphaël and incorporated on 7 July 1927 in Port Louis, Mauritius.

The company is a commercial fisheries company which is notable under Common Law for having set legal precedent in the conversion of its -year old unlimited Jouissance (Permanent Lease/ 999-year lease) into a Permanent Grant by the Privy Council (United Kingdom) in 2008 giving it title to thirteen islands known as The Thirteen Islands of St Brandon in the Indian Ocean on the isolated archipelago of the Cargados Carajos shoals.

Fishing operations 
Raphael Fishing Company has resident fishermen and fishing stations on the Cargados Carajos shoals. The Company provides support, victuals and infrastructure to sustain fishing and associated activities from fishing stations in St Brandon and through offices in Port Louis.

Fishing operations are artisanal and carried out by fishermen in teams of two using fibre glass pirogues with two outboard motors for propulsion, as nets are illegal in St Brandon. 

The company's primary ships in 2022 were MV Albatross and MV Fregate which were specially designed and commissioned in 2017 to transport fish, supplies and personnel between fishing stations in St. Brandon and Port Louis, Mauritius (a distance of circa 469 km), where the fish is sold immediately upon arrival.

Legal History and Permanent Grant 

The Legal history of Mauritius is closely correlated to its commercial, social and cultural development since the Dutch landed in 1638. In Raphael Fishing Company’s case, the forging of the Company’s permanent grant to thirteen of the thirty islands of the Cargados Carajos shoals is the product of the social and commercial development of Mauritius from 1638 to 2008.

 In 1638, Dutch colonisation of Mauritius (named after John Maurice, Prince of Nassau-Siegen) began. 

 In 1710, the Dutch abandoned Mauritius.

 In September 1715, Guillaume Dufresne d'Arsel took possession of Mauritius which became a French colony and was renamed Isle de France. The Grants or Jouissances System of Land Tenure was central to the colonisation of Mauritius. Land was granted to individuals -and subsequently to companies- in exchange for the urgent development the economy of the Isle de France and that of its surrounding islands including St Brandon which was one of many islands recognised as being a constituent part of Mauritius.

 In 1726, The Compagnie des Indes was given the Isle de France and surrounding islands as a grant by Louis XV, the King of France.

 In 1765, the ownership of the Isle de France together with associated islands reverted to the French Crown.

 In 1806, Napoleon imposed the French Civil Code (The Napoleonic Code) as the common Law of Mauritius and of its surrounding islands, including  St. Brandon or the Cargados Carajos.

Prior to the colonisation of Mauritius, most islands were covered by dense forests. The settlers needed to become self-sufficient in food to survive but also to supply garrisoned troops and visiting ships. To carry out organised agricultural activity on any meaningful scale, it was imperative to clear forests and woodlands. To succeed, where the Dutch had failed, French authorities actively encouraged the development of agriculture through the granting of literally hundreds of concessions (jouissances) of land to individuals for them to clear land and to produce much-needed food.

A jouissance or lease could be granted either for a limited or an unlimited period.

 In 1810, Britain took the Isle de France (Mauritius) by force of arms. The Isle de France (Mauritius) regained its original 1638 Dutch name of ‘‘Mauritius’’. In keeping with British constitutional practice, Mauritius was allowed to continue operating under the French legal system, the Napoleonic Code. The Civil Rights of the Mauritian people therefore remained unaffected by the forceful takeover of Mauritius and its transition to British rule.

The practice of encouraging land development by means of the grant of limited and unlimited land concessions continued with the British. One of the specific types of land tenure concession granted, first by the French and then by the British, was the "jouissance" where the ‘’droit de jouissance’’ effectively included three rights under English (and French) law: the right of possession, the right of usufruct and the right of enjoyment. 

 In 1816, the Surveyor General reported that for the whole of Mauritius 432,680 Arpents had been distributed.

 In 1820, the Governor General of Mauritius granted various jouissances covering five groups of islands in St Brandon Archipelago.
 In 1928, the Raphael Fishing Co. Ltd., purchased the rights and interests of St Brandon Fish & Manure Co. Ltd., under the 11 October 1901 Deed, after it had gone into liquidation, from Mr. Ulcoq who had bought them from the liquidator in 1925. The sale to M. Ulcoq and the subsequent sale to Raphael Fishing Co. Ltd., were duly approved by the State.

 On 11 August 1995, Court proceedings were started by The Raphael Fishing Co. Ltd., against a Mr Talbot who purported to own six islands and the Iles Boisées. The proceedings were against M. Talbot with the State of Mauritius as a co-defendant.

 On 30 May 2005, the legal proceedings by Raphael Fishing Co. Ltd., appeared to have come to an unsuccessful end in Mauritian Courts which refused the Raphael Fishing Co. Ltd., leave to appeal to the UK Privy Council.

 On 27 July 2006, the UK Privy Council granted the Raphael Fishing Co. Ltd., leave to appeal.

The Judicial Committee of the Privy Council is the final court of appeal of Mauritius. After independence in 1968, the Privy Council was maintained as the highest court of appeal. The Judicial Committee may also grant special leave to appeal from the decision of any court in any civil or criminal matter in line with section 81(5) of the Constitution of Mauritius.

 On 30 July 2008, in keeping with the Constitution of Mauritius, the Judicial Committee of the Privy Council rendered its verdict as follows: "For the reasons given in the above judgment the Board will allow this appeal, set aside the orders made in the courts below and declare that [the Raphael Fishing Co. Ltd.,] is the holder of a Permanent Grant of the islands mentioned in the 1901 Deed (...) subject to the conditions therein referred to;" The full text of the final judgment from the Judicial Committee of the Privy Council is set out here.

The Thirteen Islands of St Brandon 

The Thirteen Islands of St. Brandon that are individual parts of the Mauritia (microcontinent) and which were adjudged as a Permanent Grant by the Privy Council (United Kingdom) to Raphaël Fishing Company in 2008 are:

1.Île Raphael (Raphaël Island)
2. L'île du Sud (South Island, l'île Boisées, l'île Boisée)
3. Petit Fou Island	
4. Avocaré Island	(Avocaré Avoquer, L'Avocaire)
5. l'île aux Fous (Fous, Ile Fou)
6. L'île du Gouvernement Government Island
7. Petit Mapou Island (Small Mapou)
8. Grand Mapou Island (Big Mapou)
9. La Baleine Island (Whale Island
10. L'Île Coco	(Coco Island, Île Cocos, Île aux Cocos)
11. Île Verronge
12. l'île aux Bois	(Wooded Island)
13. La Baleine Rocks (Whale Rocks)

The St. Brandon isles are visited by less than 2000 people per annum. There is an administrative Government quota of two hundred non-Mauritians per annum.

References

Fishing areas of the Indian Ocean
Atolls of the Indian Ocean
Companies of Mauritius
Mauritius
Mauritius
Companies based in Port Louis
Industry in Mauritius